In a tribe called Marueta, located in Venezuela, South America, live the Maco people. They are one of several tribes called "Maco" by the Arawak peoples.

Indigenous peoples in Venezuela
Indigenous peoples of the Guianas